Michael Anderson (born April 7, 1986) is an American  professional basketball player who last played for the Garra Cañera de Navolato of the Circuito de Baloncesto de la Costa del Pacífico.

College statistics

|-
| style="text-align:left;"| 2004–05
| style="text-align:left;"| VCU
| 25 ||5  ||8.2  || .317 || .182 || .579|| 1.16 ||0.36  || 0.12 || 0.28 || 1.56
|-
| style="text-align:left;"| 2005–06
| style="text-align:left;"| VCU
| 29 ||4  ||14.7  || .391 || .258 || .556|| 2.90 ||0.66  || 0.59 || 0.41 || 3.28
|-
| style="text-align:left;"| 2006–07
| style="text-align:left;"| VCU
| 35 ||35  ||22.2  || .479 || .211 || .759||4.86  ||0.49  || 1.03 || 0.69 || 6.43
|-
| style="text-align:left;"| 2007–08
| style="text-align:left;"| VCU
| 31 ||29  ||23.7  || .442 || .356 || .614|| 4.61 ||0.71  || 0.81 || 0.90 || 7.16
|-
|- class="sortbottom"
! style="text-align:center;" colspan=2|  Career

!120 ||73 || 18.7 ||.434  || .283 ||.659  || 3.55 ||0.56  || 0.68 ||0.59  || 4.84
|-

Career statistics

Regular season 

|-
| align="left" | 2009–10
| align="left" | BK Inter
|12 ||  || 33.9 ||.504  || .261 ||.705  || 6.7 || 1.8 || 2.4 ||0.3  ||18.4
|-
|-
| align="left" | 2010–11
| align="left" | BC Vienna
|21 ||  || 31.2 ||.525  || .108 ||.578  || 6.4 || 0.6 || 1.5 ||1.1  ||16.0
|-
| align="left" | 2010–11
| align="left" | DAK
|50 || 22 || 28.8 ||.511  || .250 ||.713  || 5.34 || 1.30 || 1.12 ||1.18  ||12.08
|-
| align="left" | 2011–12
| align="left" | DAK
|46 || 22 || 23.8 ||.475  || .296 ||.664  || 4.83 || 0.93 || 0.70 ||1.20  ||10.46
|-
| align="left" | 2012–13
| align="left" | FWN
|18 || 5 || 21.3 ||.365  || .000 ||.707  || 3.89 || 1.22 || 1.00 ||0.61  ||6.28
|-
| align="left" | 2012–13
| align="left" | Akita
|22 ||  || 24.2 ||.409  || .163 ||.553  || 5.6 || 1.8 || 1.4 ||0.7  ||9.9 
|-
| align="left" | 2013–14
| align="left" | Nokia
|11 ||  || 28.3 ||.442  || .167 ||.750  || 6.5 || 1.3 || 1.4 ||1.0  ||12.9 
|-
| align="left" | 2014–15
| align="left" | Navolato
|22 ||21  || 33.3 ||.512  || .325 ||.690  ||8.18 || 2.32 || 1.45 ||1.00  ||18.91 
|-
| align="left" | 2015–16
| align="left" | Navolato
|4 ||4  || 22.7 ||.692  || .000 ||.625  ||5.75|| 0.75 || 0.75 ||0.75  ||10.25 
|-

Playoffs 

|-
|style="text-align:left;"|2011–12
|style="text-align:left;"|DAK
| 2 || 0 || 12.6 || .583 || .600 || 1.000 || 1.50 || 1.00 || 0.50 || 0.50 || 9.50
|-
|style="text-align:left;"|2013–14
|style="text-align:left;"|Nokia
| 8 ||   || 32.3 || .538 || .133 || .735 || 7.8 || 1.9 || 0.9 || 1.5 || 15.9
|-

External links
Akita vs Shimane
Akita vs Chiba
Akita vs Shiga

References

1986 births
Living people
Akita Northern Happinets players
American expatriate basketball people in Austria
American expatriate basketball people in Canada
American expatriate basketball people in Finland
American expatriate basketball people in Japan
American expatriate basketball people in Mexico
American expatriate basketball people in Slovakia
Basketball players from Virginia
Dakota Wizards players
Fort Wayne Mad Ants players
Garra Cañera de Navolato players
Halifax Rainmen players
VCU Rams men's basketball players
American men's basketball players
Forwards (basketball)